It's All About You may refer to:

 It's All About You (EP), by Rebecca F. & The Memes, 2006
 "It's All About You" (Fawni song), 2012
 "It's All About You" (Juliana Pasha song), 2009
 "It's All About You (Not About Me)", a song by Tracie Spencer, 1999
 "It's All About You", a song by Status Quo from the album Quid Pro Quo, 2011
 It's All About You (film), a 2002 film by Mark Fauser

See also 
 All About You (disambiguation)